Wish You Were Here is the thirteenth studio album by electronic/experimental musician Bob Ostertag, self-released on October 12, 2016.

Track listing

Personnel
Adapted from the Wish You Were Here liner notes.

Musicians
 Randy Jones – Aalto synthesizer
 Bob Ostertag – sampler

Production and design
 Rutger Zuydervelt – cover art

Release history

References

External links 
 Wish You Were Here at Bandcamp

2016 albums
Bob Ostertag albums